Imperator Nikolai I was a Russian  battleship built for the Baltic Fleet in the late 1880s. She participated in the celebration of the 400th anniversary of the discovery of America in New York City in 1892. She was assigned to the Mediterranean Squadron and visited Toulon in October 1893. She sailed for the Pacific Ocean during the First Sino-Japanese War and remained in the Pacific until late 1896, when she returned to the Mediterranean Squadron and supported Russian interests during the Cretan Revolt. She returned to the Baltic in April 1898 and had a lengthy refit, which replaced all of her machinery, before returning to the Mediterranean in 1901.

Returning to the Baltic during the Russo-Japanese War Imperator Nikolai I was refitted in late 1904 to serve as the flagship of the Third Pacific Squadron under Rear Admiral Nikolai Nebogatov. She was slightly damaged during the Battle of Tsushima and was surrendered, along with most of the Third Pacific Squadron, by Admiral Nebogatov to the Japanese the following day. She was sunk as a target ship in October 1915.

Development
Imperator Nikolai I  was originally intended as a smaller ship than her half-sister  along the lines of the Brazilian battleship , but armed with  guns. A contract was signed on 6 November 1885 with the Baltic Works for a  ship armed with two 12-inch guns in a forward barbette. However, this was quickly cancelled and a contract was quickly let with the Franco-Russian Works for a repeat of Imperator Aleksandr II even though the earlier ship had been built by the Baltic Works. The Franco-Russian Works had difficulties getting the drawings and was forced to redraft some of them. They took the opportunity to change the design in a number of relatively minor ways while doing so. However, the substitution of a gun turret for Imperator Aleksandr IIs barbette mount was made in 1887, well after the start of construction and proved problematic. The design of the turret was not finalized until April 1889 and work on the forward part of the hull had to cease for more than six months because the dimensions of the turret were not yet known. The turret proved to be  heavier than the older ship's barbette and made Imperator Nikolai I slightly bow-heavy despite a reduction in the height of the belt armor in compensation.

Description

Imperator Nikolai I had two triple-cylinder vertical compound steam engines, each driving a single propeller. Twelve cylindrical boilers provided non-superheated steam to the engines.

The main armament of the Imperator Aleksandr II-class ships was a pair of  Obukhov Model 1877 30-caliber  guns. Imperator Nikolai I carried hers in a twin-gun turret forward. The four  Obukhov Model 1877 35-caliber guns were on center-pivot mounts in casemates at the corners of the citadel, the hull given a pronounced tumblehome to increase their arcs of fire ahead and behind. The eight  Model 1877 35-caliber guns were mounted on broadside pivot mounts. Four were fitted between the 9-inch guns and could traverse a total of 100°. The others were mounted at each end of the ship where they could fire directly ahead or astern. The ten  Hotchkiss revolving cannon were mounted in hull embrasures of the ship, between the nine and six-inch guns to defend against torpedo boats. Four  Hotchkiss revolving cannon were mounted in each fighting top. Imperator Nikolai I carried six above-water  torpedo tubes. One was in the bow, two tubes were on each broadside and a tube was in the stern.

Most of Imperator Nikolai Is armor was imported from the United Kingdom and some deliveries were delayed which caused problems during construction.

History

Imperator Nikolai I was named after the Emperor Nicholas I of Russia. She was built by the Franco-Russian Works at Saint Petersburg. She was laid down on 4 August 1886, launched on 1 June 1889, and completed in July 1891, although her trials lasted until the spring of 1892. She sailed in June 1892 for New York City to participate in the celebration honoring the 400th anniversary of the discovery of America. Upon her departure she was assigned to the Mediterranean Squadron and visited Toulon in October 1893 with the Russian Squadron to reinforce the Franco-Russian Alliance. She was then commanded by Captain Richard Dicker. She sailed for the Pacific Ocean during the First Sino-Japanese War and arrived at Nagasaki, Japan on 28 April 1895, before sailing for Chefoo in China. She remained in the Pacific until late 1896, when she returned to the Mediterranean Squadron. While there, she operated as part of the International Squadron, a multinational force made up of ships of the Austro-Hungarian Navy, French Navy, Imperial German Navy, Italian Royal Navy (Regia Marina), Imperial Russian Navy, and British Royal Navy that intervened in the 1897–1898 Greek Christian uprising against the Ottoman Empire′s rule in Crete, and on 14 February 1897 she evacuated the island′s Ottoman vali (governor), George Berovich (also known as Berovich Pasha); she transported him to Trieste. She returned to the Baltic in April 1898 for an extensive, multi-year, refit. Her machinery was replaced with Belleville water-tube boilers and vertical triple expansion steam engines. Her after superstructure was cut down one deck abaft the mainmast and most of her 47 mm and 37 mm revolving cannon were removed. Only two 37 mm revolvers were retained and she received sixteen 47 mm and two 37 mm single-barreled guns in their place.

Imperator Nikolai I returned to the Mediterranean in September 1901 and remained there until the Russo-Japanese War when she was transferred to the Baltic to be refitted in late 1904 to serve as the flagship of the Third Pacific Squadron under Rear Admiral Nikolai Nebogatov. The squadron departed Liepāja on 15 January 1905 for the Pacific. She was slightly damaged during the Battle of Tsushima, receiving one hit from a twelve-inch gun, two from eight-inch guns and two from six-inch guns, and suffered only 5 killed and 35 men wounded. She was surrendered, along with most of the Third Pacific Squadron, by Admiral Nebogatov the following day.

Japanese service

On 6 June 1905, she was taken into the Imperial Japanese Navy and renamed Iki, after Iki Island in the Sea of Japan, near the site of the Battle of Tsushima. She served as a gunnery training ship until 12 December 1910 when she was redesignated as a first-class coast defense ship and a training vessel. As Iki she was armed with her original 12-inch/30 caliber guns in a forward twin turret, six 6-inch/40 caliber Armstrong Pattern Z guns in single mounts, six 4.7-inch/40 caliber Armstrong Pattern T guns in single mounts, six 3-inch/40 caliber Armstrong N guns in single mounts and six 18-inch torpedoes.

See also

List of battleships of Japan

Notes

References

Bibliography

 

 
 McTiernan, Mick, A Very Bad Place Indeed For a Soldier. The British involvement in the early stages of the European Intervention in Crete. 1897 – 1898, King's College, London, September 2014.

External links

Imperator Aleksandr II-class battleships
Ships built at Admiralty Shipyard
1889 ships
Russo-Japanese War battleships of Russia
Captured ships
Maritime incidents in 1915
Ships sunk as targets
Ships with Belleville boilers
Naval ships captured by Japan during the Russo-Japanese War